The North Argentine Railway (native name: Ferrocarril Argentino del Norte) was a State-owned railway company which built a  (metre gauge) railway network in the Argentine provinces of Catamarca and Córdoba which was later merged with the state-owned Ferrocarril Central Norte in 1909.

On 8 June 1889 a line between Chumbicha and Catamarca in Catamarca Province was opened by the state-owned company "Ferrocarril Chumbicha a Catamarca". Another state company, "Ferrocarril Deán Funes a Chilecito", completed a line between Deán Funes and Paso Viejo on 29 March 1890. The line was then extended to Patquia and finally to La Rioja in 1897.

On 1 January 1898 these two railway companies were renamed "North Argentine Railway" (NAR) and on 23 June of the same year the section from Patquia to Chilecito was opened.

The section from Chumbicha to La Rioja was opened on 1907 and on 11 October 1909, following the creation of the Argentine State Railway  ("Ferrocarriles del Estado"), the NAR was merged with the Central Northern Railway.

See also
 Central Northern Railway
 Belgrano Railway

References 

Defunct railway companies of Argentina
Railway companies established in 1898
Railway companies disestablished in 1909
Metre gauge railways in Argentina
n
n
n